The Philippines participated at the 2015 Summer Universiade in Gwangju, South Korea.

For the first time in three appearances at the Universiade, the Philippines did not send a delegation for basketball. The Philippine Olympic Committee was criticized by PSL President Susan Papa for prohibiting players from its member national sports associations from participating at the tournament.

Competitors

Badminton

Judo

Men

Swimming

Table tennis

Tennis

See also
Philippines at the Universiade

References

External links
 Country overview: Philippines on the official website

2015 in Philippine sport
Nations at the 2015 Summer Universiade
Philippines at the Summer Universiade